is a town located in Sōraku District, Kyoto Prefecture, Japan.

, the town has an estimated population of 3,312. The total area is 64.93 km².

Wazuka is home to roughly 300 tea growing families. The area was selected in the Kamakura period (1192–1333) for tea production and has enjoyed an 800-year history as one of the main production areas of Uji tea. Today Uji tea comprises only about 4% of the tea produced in Japan, and Wazuka tea only half of that. Also a considerable crop of rice is produced among other agricultural products.

The local community is in cooperation with NICE, a major volunteer program, and together hold a large annual work camp at the end of August lasting 2 weeks. The program is open to about 12 foreigners per year and an equal number of Japanese work campers.

Demographics
Per Japanese census data, the population of Wazuka has declined in recent decades.

Wazuka tea History
Kaijūsen-ji temple is often credited with bringing tea to Wazuka village. Shonin Jishin, a Zen Buddhist monk of the temple, was the first person to begin cultivation of tea there. He began cultivation on Mt. Jubu, where the practice began to spread to the village of Wazuka below. The original function of tea that was grown in Wazuka was grown for medicinal use for Zen Buddhist monks. The monks in the area used it for training at their temples.

The type of tea grown in Wazuka, Uji tea, was first introduced on to the world stage when Commodore Perry, head of the United States East Indian Squadron, influenced Japan to open up trade in the Edo Bay in 1853.

Later, the village of Wazuka itself, along with former villages Kamo-Mura and Koma-Mura, began to reach acclaim within Japan when it won a prize in a national tea exposition in Ueno Park, Tokyo in 1890.

Notable points of interest

References

External links

Wazuka official website 

Towns in Kyoto Prefecture